Kaluram Rai is a Nepalese politician, belonging to the CPN (UML) Party. He is currently serving as the member of the 2nd Federal Parliament of Nepal. In the 2022 Nepalese general election he was elected as a proportional representative from the indigenous people category.

References

Living people
Nepal MPs 2022–present
Communist Party of Nepal (Unified Marxist–Leninist) politicians
Year of birth missing (living people)